Cyperus eragrostis is a species of sedge known by several common names, including tall flatsedge, nutgrass, tall nutgrass, umbrella sedge, chufa, Earth almond, zula nuts, edible galingale and pale galingale.

Distribution
This species is native to the West Coast of North America from California to Washington, the Southeastern United States, Jamaica, and South America. It has become naturalized elsewhere in some regions in the northeastern and southeastern U.S., Europe, South Africa, and various oceanic islands (Azores, Canary Islands, Ryukyu Islands, Norfolk Island, Easter Island, etc.). It can become a weed where it is introduced; it has been known to infest rice fields.

It is found in riparian areas, roadsides ditches, damp grasslands, and other moist habitats.

Description
Cyperus eragrostis is an herbaceous perennial growing from rhizomes. It is a green sedge with tall, erect stems,  in height. Long, thin, pointed leaves radiate from the top, similar to parasol ribs.

Its flowers are found within tough, rounded, greenish-yellow or beige spikelets. Fruiting is in the summer.

See also
 List of Cyperus species

References

External links
USDA Plants Profile for Cyperus eragrostis (tall flatsedge)
 Calflora Database:  Cyperus eragrostis (Tall cyperus,  Tall flatsedge)
Jepson Manual eFlora (TJM2) treatment of Cyperus eragrostis
UC CalPhotos gallery of Cyperus eragrostis

eragrostis
Freshwater plants
Flora of South America
Flora of the Northwestern United States
Flora of the Southeastern United States
Flora of California
Natural history of the California chaparral and woodlands
Plants described in 1791